Cross Damon was a fictional character from Richard Wright's 1953 novel The Outsider.  Cross Damon was viewed as an "outsider" who did not attempt to become a product of the established culture of American society. Cross was considered a complete opposite to Bigger Thomas, another character created by Richard Wright in his novel Native Son.  He also ridicules Communist techniques and lives according to the principles of free choice. Cross Damon committed murder in a completely different spirit than Bigger Thomas.  He acts as an individual who is free to do whatever his habits and desires lead him to do.  His is not a victim of social and environmental pressures outside his control.  In many ways, Cross Damon resembles Meursault, the hero of Albert Camus novel The Stranger.  Both men lived outside of any involvement with common humanity and paid no attention to social mores.

See also

The Outsider - Richard Wright's 1953 novel
Native Son - Richard Wright's 1940 novel
The Stranger - Albert Camus' 1942 novel

Damon, Cross
Damon, Cross
Literary characters introduced in 1953